Max Hürzeler (born 4 July 1954) is a retired Swiss cyclist. After winning a bronze medal at the UCI Motor-paced World Championships in 1981 in the amateurs division he turned professional and won a silver medal in 1984 and a gold medal in 1987. He also won three European (1983, 1986 and 1987) and seven national titles (1981–1987) in motor-paced racing.

After retiring from competitions he founded a cycling holidays company in Mallorca and improved the roads in the area. Using the money earned from the company he financially supported the Sixday-Nights Zürich race.

References

1954 births
Living people
Swiss male cyclists
People from Dübendorf
UCI Track Cycling World Champions (men)
Swiss track cyclists
Sportspeople from the canton of Zürich